Cynthia Jane Williams (August 22, 1947 – January 25, 2023) was an American actress and producer, known for her role as Shirley Feeney on the television sitcoms Happy Days (1975–1979), and Laverne & Shirley (1976–1982). She also appeared in American Graffiti (1973) and The Conversation (1974).

Early life
Williams was born in Van Nuys, Los Angeles on August 22, 1947. The family moved to Dallas when she was a year old and returned to Los Angeles when she was ten years old. She had a sister named Carol Ann.

Williams wrote and acted at a church during childhood and later acted in productions at Birmingham High School; she graduated in 1965. She attended Los Angeles City College where she majored in theater.

Career
After college, Williams began her professional career by landing national commercials, which included Foster Grant sunglasses and TWA. Her first roles in television, among others, were on Room 222, Nanny and the Professor, and Love, American Style.

Williams accompanied an actor-friend from Los Angeles City College who needed a scene partner for the audition and was also accepted at The Actors Studio West, but rarely attended due to acting commitments. Williams picked up important film roles early in her career: George Cukor's Travels with My Aunt (1972); as Laurie Henderson, Ron Howard's character's high school sweetheart in George Lucas's American Graffiti (1973) for which she earned a BAFTA nomination as Best Supporting Actress; and Francis Ford Coppola's The Conversation (1974). She auditioned along with thousands of others, for Lucas's Star Wars for the role of Princess Leia, but Leia was ultimately played by Carrie Fisher because Lucas wished to cast unknowns, as in American Graffiti.

Williams met Penny Marshall, first on a double date, and later at Francis Ford Coppola’s Zoetrope company. The company hired them as comedy writers, because "they wanted two women" on a prospective TV spoof for the Bicentennial. While the two were writing for Zoetrope, Penny Marshall's brother, Garry Marshall, called to ask if they would like to make an appearance on an episode of Happy Days, a television series he produced.

In 1975, Williams was cast as a fun-loving brewery bottle capper, Shirley Feeney, in an episode of Happy Days with Penny who played her best friend and roommate Laverne De Fazio. The girls were cast as "sure-thing" dates of Richie and Fonzie (Henry Winkler). Their appearance proved so popular that Garry Marshall, commissioned a spin-off series for the characters of Shirley and Laverne. Williams continued her role on the very successful Laverne & Shirley series from 1976 until 1982. At one point during its run, the series was the number one rated show on television. Williams was praised for her portrayal of Shirley Feeney. She left the show after the second episode of the show's eighth and what would become its final season, after she became pregnant with her first child. The show's various producers were not enthusiastic that Williams was pregnant, as her character Shirley was not pregnant. Williams and co-star Penny Marshall had also been feuding for quite some time on the set long before Williams became pregnant. They would reconcile many years later. The success of the TV series led to a short-lived Saturday morning animated series Laverne & Shirley in the Army (1981–82), created by Hanna-Barbera.

In 1979, she reprised her role of Laurie from American Graffiti in its sequel, More American Graffiti.

In 1985, she starred in the sci-fi comedy UFOria alongside Fred Ward and Harry Dean Stanton, a movie which was already completed in 1981.

In 1990, Williams starred in an unsold pilot for CBS that was adapted from the 1989 film Steel Magnolias. Williams was cast as M'Lynn Eatenton, the role that was originated by Sally Field in the film. Also in 1990, Williams returned to series TV in the short-lived sitcom Normal Life and, a couple of years later, reunited with former Laverne & Shirley producers Thomas L. Miller and Robert L. Boyett to star in their family sitcom Getting By (1993–94). She guest starred on several television shows, including two episodes of 8 Simple Rules.

Williams performed onstage in the national tours of Grease, Deathtrap, and Moon Over Buffalo as well as a regional production of Nunsense. She reunited with her Laverne & Shirley co-star Eddie Mekka in a November 2008 regional production of the Renée Taylor-Joseph Bologna comedy play It Had to Be You.

She made her Broadway debut as daffy Mrs. Tottendale in The Drowsy Chaperone at the Marquis Theatre on December 11, 2007, succeeding Jo Anne Worley in the role which was originated by Georgia Engel.

Williams reunited with Penny Marshall on the TV series Sam & Cat in the episode "#SalmonCat" (2013). In 2015, her memoir Shirley, I Jest! (co-written with Dave Smitherman) was published. In the same year, Williams engaged in celebrity branding for the senior citizen service Visiting Angels.

Personal life
Williams was married to Bill Hudson of the musical trio Hudson Brothers in 1982. They had two children and the marriage ended in divorce in 2000. 

Williams was a Roman Catholic.

Death
After a brief illness, Williams died in Los Angeles on January 25, 2023, at the age of 75.

Filmography

Film

Television

References

External links

 
 
 Video Discussion with Actress Cindy Williams at New York Film Academy
 

1947 births
2023 deaths
20th-century American actresses
21st-century American actresses
Actresses from Los Angeles
American film actresses
American Roman Catholics
American television actresses
American people of Italian descent
American people of English descent
American voice actresses
Birmingham High School alumni
Hudson family (show business)
Los Angeles City College alumni
People from Van Nuys, Los Angeles